(born August 11, 1970) is a Japanese video game director and producer. He graduated from the Division of Graphics at the Sozosha College of Design and joined the game development company Capcom in 1991. He served as the producer for Onimusha 3 and Lost Planet and chief producer for Resident Evil 5. Takeuchi has also worked on other Capcom games such as Street Fighter II for the Super Nintendo Entertainment System and Resident Evil and Resident Evil 2 for the PlayStation.

In 2012 he was appointed as the head of Capcom's Development Division 1, a division primarily focused on the development of Resident Evil but also Devil May Cry and other titles focused on western audiences.

Works

References

Dunn, Brian. Post details: Exclusive Lost Planet Producer Interview - Jun Takeuchi (January 30, 2007). lostplanetcommunity.com. Retrieved on July 27, 2007.

External links

MobyGames profile

1970 births
Capcom people
Japanese video game producers
Living people
Video game artists